Giannis Zapropoulos (born 20 March 1982) is a Greek football defender who plays for Ionikos F.C. in the Beta Ethniki.

Professional career
Zapropoulos made his professional debut in the 2002–03 season with B' Ethniki side Kalamata.  Over the next two seasons he became a fixture in the Kalamata defense, playing 44 matches.

His good performances with Kalamata earned him a transfer to A' Ethniki in the summer of 2005, when he signed a 2-year contract with Egaleo.  Zapropoulos made 25 starts and 27 total appearances in his first season in the top flight, while Egaleo finished 10th in the league.  The following season though Zapropoulos was relegated to the bench as a result of a contract dispute.

Zapropoulos' contract with Egaleo expired at the end of the 2006–07 season, and he thereafter signed a 1-year contract with another with A' Ethniki club, Apollon Kalamarias.  Zapropoulos made 11 starts and 19 total appearances, playing primarily as a defensive midfielder.  Kalamaria was relegated to B' Ethniki at the end of the season.

Free from Kalamaria, in July 2008 Zapropoulos signed a 2-year contract with ambitious B' Ethniki side Ethnikos Piraeus.

References

External links
Profile at Onsports.gr

1982 births
Living people
Greek footballers
Ethnikos Piraeus F.C. players
Apollon Pontou FC players
Kalamata F.C. players
Egaleo F.C. players
Panserraikos F.C. players
Association football defenders
Association football midfielders
People from Thessaloniki (regional unit)
Footballers from Central Macedonia